Winning Combinations: Deep Purple and Rainbow is a compilation album by Deep Purple and Rainbow. The album was released on 17 June 2003.

Track listing

Deep Purple
"Bad Attitude" (Ian Gillan, Ritchie Blackmore, Roger Glover, Jon Lord) – 4:44
"Hush" (live) (Joe South) – 3:30
"Perfect Strangers" (Gillan, Blackmore, Glover) – 5:28
"Highway Star" (live) (Gillan, Blackmore, Glover, Lord, Ian Paice) – 6:12
"Mean Streak" (Gillan, Blackmore, Glover) – 4:22

Rainbow

"Rock Fever" (Joe Lynn Turner, Blackmore) – 3:51
"Since You Been Gone" (Russ Ballard) – 3:18
"I Surrender" (live) (Ballard) – 5:44
"Stone Cold" (Turner, Blackmore, Glover) – 5:17
"Street of Dreams" (Turner, Blackmore) – 4:25

References

Rainbow (rock band) compilation albums
Split albums
2003 compilation albums
Deep Purple compilation albums